The Storms of Early Summer: Semantics of Song is the second full-length album by the American indie rock band Cursive, released in 1998.

It was the 22nd release of Saddle Creek Records.

Track listing

Musicians
Tim Kasher
Matt Maginn
Steve Pedersen
Clint Schnase
AJ Mogis – recording, engineering, production

References

External links
Official Cursive website
Saddle Creek Records

1998 albums
Cursive (band) albums
Saddle Creek Records albums